Amelia Cary, Viscountess Falkland (née FitzClarence; 21 March 1820 – 2 July 1858), was a British noblewoman. She was born the fifth illegitimate daughter of William IV of the United Kingdom (then Duke of Clarence and St Andrews) by his long-time mistress Dorothea Jordan. Amelia had four sisters and five brothers, all surnamed FitzClarence. Soon after their father became monarch, the FitzClarence children were raised to the ranks of younger children of a marquess. A granddaughter of George III, Amelia was named after her aunt Princess Amelia.

Family and early life
Amelia FitzClarence was the fifth daughter of Prince William, Duke of Clarence, by his long-time mistress, the famous comic actress Dorothea Jordan. Dorothea was the most successful actress of her day and continued to act on the stage during their relationship. Amelia had nine siblings from the relationship, four sisters and five brothers all surnamed FitzClarence. While circumstances prevented the couple from ever marrying, for twenty years William and Dorothea enjoyed domestic stability and were devoted to their children. In 1797, they moved from Clarence Lodge to Bushy House, residing at the Teddington residence until 1807. Amelia was born there.

Amelia's niece Wilhelmina would later write that Bushy was "a happy and beloved home" until it "came to end" upon Prince William's marriage to Princess Adelaide of Saxe-Meiningen in 1818. He and Dorothea had parted ways in December 1811 under a deed of separation, the debt-ridden duke desiring to secure a rich wife. Dorothea was granted £4,400 and the task of caring for their daughters; William was permitted to visit them until they turned thirteen. She left Bushy in January 1812. The money was not enough to cover her debts, however. Dorothea continued to act on the stage after his leaving. In 1815, she moved from London to Boulogne, France, to evade her creditors. On 5 July 1816, she died there alone. She had suffered from ill health and possessed little money, having squandered the bulk of it on her eldest daughter, Frances (fathered by another man).

William's new wife, Princess Adelaide, was gentle and loving to the FitzClarence children. In 1818, Amelia and her siblings were granted a pension of £500. In 1819, Baron Franz Ludwig von Bibra, a German man with knowledge of the classics and English, was engaged to tutor the two youngest FitzClarence daughters. He left in 1822, upon the completion of their education. In June 1830, the Duke of Clarence succeeded his brother George IV as King William IV. The following year, he made his eldest son, George, Earl of Munster, and had his issue by Jordan raised to the ranks of younger children of a marquess. With their father now monarch, the FitzClarences frequently attended court but their presence angered the Duchess of Kent, who felt that the FitzClarences would be a corrupting influence on her daughter, Princess Victoria. King William loved his children and was aggrieved at their treatment at the hands of the Duchess, who would leave the room whenever they entered.

Marriage and issue
She married Lucius Cary, 10th Viscount Falkland, in 1830. They had one son, Lucius William Charles Frederick Cary, Master of Falkland (24 November 1831 – 6 August 1871), who married Sarah Christiana Keighly (d. 4 October 1902). The couple lived at Rudby Hall, North Yorkshire.  Amelia died in London on 2 July 1858.

Legacy 
 namesake of Falkland Ridge, Nova Scotia, Canada
author of Chow-Chow: Being Selections from a Journal Kept in India, Egypt, and Syria

Ancestry

References

Popular Culture

In 1841 Henry Russell dedicated the song The Pilgrim's Address to the Deity to Lady Falkland.

Works cited

 
 
 
 
 
 
 

 

1807 births
1858 deaths
19th-century British people
19th-century British women
Illegitimate children of William IV of the United Kingdom
Amelia
Daughters of British marquesses
Daughters of kings
Scottish viscountesses